Tropidoturris planilirata is a species of sea snail, a marine gastropod mollusk in the family Borsoniidae.

Description
The size of the biconic shell attains 16.8 mm. Characteristical for this species is the fact that the shell has no axial ribs. The broad spiral lirae are close and flattened. The shoulder cord is very weak.

Distribution
This marine species occurs off KwaZulu-Natal, South Africa

References
.
 Steyn, D.G. & Lussi, M. (1998) Marine Shells of South Africa. An Illustrated Collector’s Guide to Beached Shells. Ekogilde Publishers, Hartebeespoort, South Africa, ii + 264 pp. page(s): 156

External links
 

Endemic fauna of South Africa
planilirata
Gastropods described in 1986